Each yard on a square or gaff rigged sailing ship is equipped with a footrope for sailors to stand on while setting or stowing the sails.

Formerly, the footrope was the rope sewn along the lower edge of a square sail, and the rope below the yards was called the horse or Flemish horse.  These terms will be encountered when reading the classic 18th and 19th century sailing manuals, and may still be used today when referring to older ships.

Although square sails are mostly worked from the deck, in order to be properly stowed (and released from this stowage) they must be folded by hand and tied to the yard with gaskets. This requires sailors to go aloft, during which time they stand on the footropes. The ropes are made of either fibre or wire, and are almost always protected from wear by being wormed, parcelled and served, so that the visible outer coating is of tarred thin line. They are attached to the yard via the jackstays or "handrails" to which the sails are also fastened, tied on with many turns of thin line. The inner parts of the footrope are held up towards the yard by vertical lines called stirrups; one of these is visible in the picture on the right. Also visible is the flemish horse that the outermost sailor stands on; because this yard is quite small the flemish horse actually extends fairly close to the centre.

Sailors get onto the footropes from the ratlines up the mast. Lower down, where everything is bigger, there may be a small length of footrope bridging the gap between ratlines and yard; this is especially necessary on the windward side when the yards are braced hard round, as the gap becomes quite large. Because the yard must be free to move, this footrope is rather loose and hence unstable. Higher up the gap is small enough to step across, though it may be a stretch when hard-braced. Since the footrope will react to the extra weight placed on it, the practice on some ships is to call "stepping on port" (or starboard) before getting on, to warn those already using it.

Once on the yard, modern sailors are able to clip their harnesses onto a safety wire that runs along it (on most ships they will have been unsecured until this point) - in the past, crews enjoyed no such protection. The sailors will now edge out along the footrope until they are spread evenly along the yard. Leaning forwards over the yard helps with balancing on the footrope, but where the buntlines come down to the yard it is necessary to lean back or crouch down to get around them. The outermost member of the crew must step off the footrope (calling "stepping off starboard" (or port) if that is the practice) across a small gap onto the flemish horse in order to reach the end of the yard where the clew of the sail is to be hauled up or let go.

Because the footrope provides a rather narrow area to stand on, it can cause sore feet after a while. Modern sailors joining a tall ship are advised to take footwear with a solid sole that will spread the load, rather than the flexible deck shoes and seaboots used on yachts.

See also 
 Ratlines

Nautical terminology
Sailing rigs and rigging